Parkwood is a neighborhood of Louisville, Kentucky near Iroquois Park. It is located along Manslick Road and Gagel Avenue.

References

Neighborhoods in Louisville, Kentucky